The Baptist Generals are an American indie band from the town of Denton, Texas.

Baptist Generals formed in 1998 by singer-songwriter Chris "Cee" Flemmons and drummer Steve Hill. Originally they played for beer money as a street act on Denton's infamous Fry Street, but later moved from the street to playing house shows and then later clubs nationally and abroad. Over the years the band has grown to include a rotating cast of Denton and former Denton musicians. Hill left the band in 2007.

In 2007 the group refined their live show, choosing to move away from their amplified presentation in favor of chamber style acoustic sets performed on the band's traveling rug in alternative spaces such as art galleries, museums and non-bar facilities.

In March 2012 the band returned to electrified performance as part of 35 Denton, a festival Flemmons founded and spent many years organizing.

On August 23, 2012, The Baptist Generals announced on their fan page that they had completed a new album. No other information was available.

The band's list of releases include a 9-song EP, Dog released in 1998 on now-defunct Quality Park Records, as well as the LP No Silver/No Gold released in 2003 on Sub Pop Records.

Jackleg Devotional to the Heart
On Wednesday, March 27, 2013 Subpop Records announced the Generals 3rd album, Jackleg Devotional to the Heart would be released via the label on May 21, 2013.

Trivia

 Chris Flemmons is the son of the late Fort Worth Star-Telegram Travel Editor, Texana author, and Texas historian, Jerry Flemmons.
 Attending junior college in Wisconsin, Steve Hill worked as a drummer for John Zorn while Zorn developed his music game piece, Cobra.

Discography

Albums

Dog (1998)
Void Touching Faster Victuals (EP) (2002)
No Silver/No Gold (2003)
Jackleg Devotional to the Heart (2013)

Reference List

External links
Official website
profile at subpop

American folk rock groups
Indie rock musical groups from Texas
Musical groups from Denton, Texas
Sub Pop artists